Meris is a genus of moths in the family Geometridae described by George Duryea Hulst in 1896.

Species
Meris paradoxa Rindge, 1981
Meris suffusaria McDunnough, 1940
Meris patula Rindge, 1981
Meris alticola Hulst, 1896
Meris cultrata Rindge, 1981

References

Ourapterygini